Dr. Ram Manohar Lohiya National Law University (RMLNLU) is a public law school and a National Law University located in Lucknow, Uttar Pradesh, India. It was established as Dr. Ram Manohar Lohiya National Law Institute in 2005, and since then, has been providing undergraduate and post-graduate legal education. It ranks 11th among India's law institutes in the 2020 edition of National Institutional Ranking Framework reports by the Ministry of Education (India) (erstwhile MHRD). The university is fully-funded by the (state) Government of Uttar Pradesh.

History 
Dr. Ram Manohar Lohiya National Law University, was established by an Act of Govt. of Uttar Pradesh in 2005 and came into being on 4 January 2006 to meet up the new challenges in legal field. Originally incorporated as 'Dr.Ram Manohar Lohiya National Law Institute, Uttar Pradesh' word 'Institute' was substituted by the 'University' later, via an amendment in the Act in November 2006. This was done to give a comprehensive national character to the institute on lines with the other National Law Universities of the country.

Academics

Admission

Common Law Admission Test (CLAT) is a centralized test for admission to prominent National Law Universities in India. All admissions in RMLNLU, for both undergraduate and postgraduate programs are made on the basis of performance in the CLAT exam. (Part-time courses have a different selection procedure)

Academic programmes 
The university currently offers B.A./LL.B. (Hons.) (Five years integrated programme), LL.M. (One year programme), PhD. and a few PG courses.(part-time)

Undergraduate 
RMLNLU offers undergraduates a five-year integrated B.A./LL.B. (Hons.) programme which, upon completion, qualifies the student to sit for the bar to practice law in India.

The intake capacity of B.A. LL.B. (Hons.) Programme is 169 + 18 NRI Seats

Postgraduate 
RMLNLU offers a one-year degree in LL.M. programme.

The intake is 24 and 07 (supernumerary seats) per year

Diploma Courses 
The university is also running a one-year Post-graduate Diploma Programme in Cyber Law since 2014, one year Post-graduate diploma Programme in Intellectual Property Right since 2015 and One Year Post-graduate Diploma Programme in Media Law, Entertainment and Ethics since 2019.

Foreign Language 
RMLNLU offers certificate courses in French, German and Spanish.

Rankings

The university was ranked seventh by India Todays "India's Best Law Colleges 2022". The National Institutional Ranking Framework (NIRF) ranked it 17 among law colleges in 2022.

Student life

Student committees 
 Legal Aid Committee: Among other things, the committee runs a legal aid clinic where marginalized sections of the society can get free legal advice.
 Moot Court Committee
 Debate and Discussion Committee
 Cultural Committee (Tehzeeb)
 Journal Committee
 Internship and Placement
 Sports Committee
 Seminar Committee
 Student Welfare Committee

See also
 Legal education in India
 List of law schools in India

References

External links
 Official website

Dr. Ram Manohar Lohiya National Law University
Universities and colleges in Lucknow
Universities in Uttar Pradesh
National Law Universities
Memorials to Ram Manohar Lohia
2005 establishments in Uttar Pradesh
Educational institutions established in 2005